Frank Ray Perilli (August 30, 1925 – March 8, 2018) was an American screenwriter with more than 15 screen credits, and a playwright of four stage plays.  He began his career as a standup comic in the mob-controlled nightclubs of Chicago’s North Side, and made appearances on major television shows of the day such as The Ed Sullivan Show.  His acting career included more than a dozen feature films, some of which he wrote and/or produced.  He was also a comedy writer for Don Rickles, Shecky Greene, and Lenny Bruce, among others, and at times a manager for Greene and Bruce.  His biography, The Candy Butcher by William Karl Thomas, was released in 2016 by Media Maestro-Book Division.

He is known for such films as She Came to the Valley, End of the World, Laserblast, Mansion of the Doomed and Alligator.

Actor
He had a role in as a jail officer in the 1993 film The Fugitive. In 1995, he played the role of BJ in Steal Big Steal Little.

Writer
Along with Franne Schacht, he wrote the story for Laserblast which starred Kim Milford, Cheryl Smith, Gianni Russo, and Roddy McDowall. He has also worked with Michael Pataki on more than one occasion.

Work with Albert Band
Perilli has worked with director Albert Band on more than one occasion. With Louis A. Garfinkle, he wrote the story for the 1973 film Little Cigars which Chris Christenberry directed and Albert Band produced. It starred Angel Tompkins as a beautiful lady who teamed up with a group of midgets.  More work with Band came in 1977, with Dracula's Dog. They also worked together on the western She Came to the Valley. In 1993, it was Joey Takes a Cab.

Filmography

References

External links
 
 
 The Candy Butcher, a biography of Frank Ray Perilli

American male film actors
American film producers
American film directors
American screenwriters
1925 births
2018 deaths